Ganjabad-e Pain may refer to:
 Ganjabad-e Pain, East Azerbaijan
 Ganjabad-e Pain, Anbarabad, Kerman Province
 Ganjabad-e Pain, Qaleh Ganj, Kerman Province

See also
Ganjabad-e Sofla (disambiguation)